José Felipe Rocha Costa (born in 21 April 1998), better known by his stage name Zé Felipe, is a Brazilian singer and songwriter, currently one of the most relevant artists in Brazil nowadays, he is married to blogger Virgínia Fonseca with whom he has two daughters: Maria Alice (born 2020) and Maria Flor (born 2022).

Career
Growing up in a very artistic family, in 2009, he learned his first guitar chords with his father Leonardo, a famous sertanejo player and performed in public and various occasions. In December 2013, Zé Felipe appeared in his father's live album and DVD Leonardo - 30 Ano with a medley of "Deixaria Tudo" / "Te Amo Demais" / "Coração Espinhado".

In 2014, he was signed to Sony Music, and appeared in the live entertainment show Domingão do Faustão. In September 2014 he debuted with his album premiered his race in the televising program Domingão of Faustão. In October 2014 he released his debut album entitled Você e Eu (meaning You and Me) that sold 50,000 copies followed by the album Proibido é Mais Gostoso in June 2016 that sold 40,000 copies and was certified gold by Pro-Música Brasil. In 2017 he released his live album and DVD Na Mesma Estrada.

Discography

Studio albums

Live albums

Live DVDs

Singles

Promotional singles

Featured in

Other appearances

References

External links
Official website

21st-century Brazilian male singers
21st-century Brazilian singers
1998 births
Living people